Courage in Red is a 13-part television documentary that details many aspects of crime that the Royal Canadian Mounted Police must contend with on a daily basis.  Each 30 minute episode focuses on a certain aspect of the RCMP such as training at the RCMP Academy, Depot Division in Regina, frontline police work, the Emergency Response Team, canine unit, and VIP protection among others.

The show aired on OLN from November 1 to December 13, 2009 and aired on SCN from February 23 to May 21, 2010.

Episodes

References

2000s Canadian documentary television series
Royal Canadian Mounted Police
Non-fiction works about crime in Canada
Non-fiction works about law in Canada
Works about law enforcement in Canada